Archible Ernest "Buck" Houghton (May 4, 1915 – May 14, 1999) was an American television producer and writer best known for producing the first three seasons of The Twilight Zone, as well as many other television programs and independent films from the 1950s through the 1990s. He first entered the film industry as a reader and story editor for David O. Selznick in the 1930s. He moved over to Paramount, working his way up to the casting office and then to the budget department. During World War II, he helped make films for the Office of War Information. Following the war, Houghton assisted executive producers at RKO, and had a two-year stint as a story editor for MGM. He soon became involved in producing early TV dramas such as “China Smith,” “Meet McGraw,” “Yancy Derringer” and “Man with a Camera.” 

Houghton reached a pinnacle in his career when he was hired by  Bill Self at CBS to produce the first 39 episodes of  Rod Serling's “The Twilight Zone” in its original half-hour format. When the network insisted the fourth season consist of hour-long shows, Buck decided it was time to move on. His subsequent collaboration with dramatist Clifford Odets, "The Richard Boone Show" (1963–64) was the only repertory company on television, in which a resident cast of actors played different roles in a TV play every week. It was nominated for the Outstanding Dramatic Series Emmy Award in 1964.

Other credits include seasons of “High Chaparral,” “Harry O.,” “Hawaii 5-O” and the American Zoetrope film, "The Escape Artist."

Early life
Houghton was born in Denver, CO. His parents moved to Los Angeles because of his mother's ill health; she died when he was eleven years old. He graduated from Los Angeles High School in 1933, where he was known as Arch Houghton. He attended UCLA, where he was a member of the Phi Kappa Psi fraternity, majored in Economics and English and lettered in varsity track and field as a high-jumper. While attending high school and college, he helped out backstage on several films by Cecil B. DeMille, along with his close friend and classmate Horace Hahn.

Family
He and Wanda Jackson were married in 1946 and remained so until his death. He was the father of Jim Houghton and Mona Houghton.

Death
Houghton died in Los Angeles at the age of 84 on May 14, 1999. He was suffering from emphysema and Lou Gehrig's disease.

Filmography, Producer/Writer

Filmography, Actor

Published works
 What a Producer Does (Samuel French) is a primer for would-be film and television producers.

References

External links
 

1915 births
1999 deaths
Television producers from California
Deaths from emphysema
Deaths from motor neuron disease
Neurological disease deaths in California
20th-century American businesspeople
University of California, Los Angeles alumni
Los Angeles High School alumni